The genus Palaemonias comprises two species of endangered, albinistic, obligate cave shrimp:
 Alabama cave shrimp – Palaemonias alabamae Smalley, 1961  
 Kentucky cave shrimp – Palaemonias ganteri Hay, 1901

References

Atyidae
Crustaceans of the United States
Fauna of the Southeastern United States
Freshwater crustaceans of North America
Cave shrimp